The Ambetter Health 200 is a NASCAR Xfinity Series race held at New Hampshire Motor Speedway in Loudon, New Hampshire. When first held in 1990, the race was 300 laps. It was scaled back to 250 laps, the length of the former fall NHMS race, starting in 1993, and again to its current 200 laps in 1996.

Until 2010, in 23 races held at NHMS, there had never been a repeat Xfinity Series winner, the longest such streak in any of NASCAR's national touring series. Kyle Busch broke the streak with victories in 2009 and 2010. He would also win the 2011, 2013, 2016, and 2017 Xfinity Series races at the track. Brad Keselowski and Christopher Bell would later also become repeat winners of the Xfinity Series race at New Hampshire. Additionally, Toyota and Joe Gibbs Racing won this race each year from 2008 to 2021 except for Keselowski's two wins in 2012 and 2014, both of which were for Team Penske. He drove a Dodge in 2012 and a Ford in 2014.

History

From 1990 to 1992, New Hampshire held a second Busch Series race in the fall. The second race was removed from the schedule in 1993, in exchange for a Winston Cup Series race at the track. During the practice for the 2000 event, Adam Petty died after he lost control of his car after his throttle were stuck wide open going into turn three; Petty's death was caused by a basilar skull fracture from the ensuing impact. Cup Series driver Kenny Irwin Jr. also died under similar circumstances during the practice of thatlook.com 300, occurring eight weeks later at the same track, leading NASCAR to make significant rule changes to maintain driver safety.

The 2020 race was canceled and replaced by a race at Kentucky Speedway due to the COVID-19 pandemic.

In 2021, the race returned to the Xfinity Series schedule and Ambetter (owned by Centene Corporation) became the title sponsor of the race. With them being a healthcare company and the race being held during the time when people were getting COVID-19 vaccines, Ambetter added "get vaccinated" in the name of the race next to their own so it would sound like "better get vaccinated" to encourage people to get a COVID-19 vaccine. On May 21, 2022, it was announced that Crayon Software Experts would be the title sponsor of the Xfinity Series of the race after Ambetter became the title sponsor of the Cup Series race at New Hampshire in 2022 (replacing Foxwoods Resort Casino).

Past winners

2005, 2011, and 2013: Race extended due to a green–white–checker finish. 2013 race took three attempts.
2020: Race canceled and moved to Kentucky due to the COVID-19 pandemic.

Multiple winners (drivers)

Multiple winners (teams)

Manufacturer wins

References

External links
 

1990 establishments in New Hampshire
NASCAR Xfinity Series races
 
Recurring sporting events established in 1990
Annual sporting events in the United States